Issei or Issey is a  masculine Japanese given name. Notable people with the name include:

, Japanese baseball player
, Japanese actor, voice actor and narrator
, Japanese association football player
, Japanese politician
, Japanese politician
, Japanese politician
, Japanese fashion designer
, Japanese voice actor
, Japanese jazz fusion guitarist
, Japanese actor and comedian
, Japanese volleyball player
, Japanese criminal
, Japanese photographer
, Japanese politician
, Japanese shogi player
, Japanese writer
, Japanese astronomer
Issei Mamehara (豆原 一成, born 2002), Japanese idol, member of JO1

Fictional character 

 Issei Matsukawa (松川 一静), a character from the manga and anime Haikyu!! with the position of middle blocker from Aoba Johsai High

Japanese masculine given names